The politics of Zimbabwe takes place in a framework of a full presidential republic, whereby the President is the head of state and government as organized by the 2013 Constitution. Executive power is exercised by the government. Legislative power is vested in both the government and parliament. The status of Zimbabwean politics has been thrown into question by a 2017 coup.

Political developments since the Lancaster House Agreement

The Zimbabwean Constitution, initially from the Lancaster House Agreement a few months before the 1980 elections, chaired by Lord Carrington, institutionalises majority rule and protection of minority rights. Since independence, the Constitution has been amended by the government to provide for:

The abolition of seats reserved for whites in the country's parliament in 1987;
The abolition of the office of prime minister in 1987 and the creation of an executive presidency. (The office was restored in 2009, and abolished again in 2013.)
The abolition of the Senate in 1990 (reintroduced in 2005), and the creation of appointed seats in the House of Assembly.

The elected government controls senior appointments in the public service, including the military and police, and ensures that appointments at lower levels are made on an equitable basis by the independent Public Service Commission.

ZANU-PF leader Robert Mugabe, elected prime minister in 1980, revised the constitution in 1987 to make himself president. President Mugabe's affiliated party  won every election from independence on April 18, 1980, until it lost the parliamentary elections in March 2008 to the Movement for Democratic Change. In some quarters corruption and rigging elections have been alleged. In particular the elections of 1990 were nationally and internationally condemned as being rigged, with the second-placed party, Edgar Tekere's Zimbabwe Unity Movement, winning only 20% of the vote. Presidential elections were held in 2002 amid allegations of vote-rigging, intimidation, and fraud, and again in March 2008.

Ethnic rivalry between the Shona and Ndebele has played a large part in Zimbabwe's politics, a consequence of the country's borders defined by its British colonial rulers. This continued after independence in 1980, during the Gukurahundi ethnic cleansing liberation wars in Matabeleland in the 1980s. This led to the political merger of Joshua Nkomo's Zimbabwe African People's Union (ZAPU) with the ruling Zimbabwe African National Union (ZANU) to form ZANU-PF and the appointment of Nkomo as vice president.

During 2005, with Mugabe's future in question, factionalism within the Shona has increased. In October 2005 it was alleged that members of the ruling ZANU-PF and the opposition MDC had held secret meetings in London and Washington to discuss plans for a new Zimbabwe after Robert Mugabe. On February 6, 2007, Mugabe orchestrated a Cabinet reshuffle, ousting ministers including 5-year veteran Minister of Finance Herbert Murerwa.

Political conditions

Since the defeat of the constitutional referendum in 2000, politics in Zimbabwe has been marked by a move from the norms of democratic governance, such as democratic elections, the independence of the judiciary, the rule of law, freedom from racial discrimination, the existence of independent media, civil society and academia. Recent years have seen widespread violations of human rights.

Elections have been marked by political violence and intimidation, along with the politicisation of the judiciary, military, police force and public services. Statements by the President and government politicians have referred to a state of war, or Chimurenga, against the opposition political parties, in particular the Movement for Democratic Change – Tsvangirai (MDC-T). Newspapers not aligned with the government have been closed down and members of the judiciary have been threatened and/or arrested. Repressive laws aimed at preventing freedoms of speech, assembly and association have been implemented and subjectively enforced. Members of the opposition are routinely arrested and harassed, with some subjected to torture or sentenced to jail. The legal system has come under increasing threat. The MDC has repeatedly attempted to use the legal system to challenge the ruling ZANU-PF, but the rulings, often in favour of the MDC, have not been taken into account by the police.

Government of Zimbabwe

Political power in Zimbabwe is split between three branches, the executive, the legislative and the judicial branches, with the President as the head of the executive branch, the Prime Minister the head of the legislative branch and the Chief Justice of the Supreme Court of Zimbabwe the head of the judicial branch.

Executive 

What are the Powers of the Executive?

Under the present Zimbabwean Constitution, the President’s powers can be grouped roughly into the following categories:

Power over the Legislature, namely the power to summon, adjourn and dissolve Parliament, and the power to appoint members of Parliament.
Power over the Judiciary, namely the power to appoint judges and other members of the judiciary.
Power to appoint members of the Executive, namely Cabinet Ministers and administrative officers such as public servants.
Power to appoint ambassadors and members of constitutional Commissions.
Power over the security forces, namely the Defence Forces and the Police.
Legislative power, namely the power to enact legislation.
Power to declare war and make peace
Miscellaneous powers, such as the exercise of the prerogative of mercy and the power to confer honours and precedence. The grant of a pardon or respite from execution of sentence or the substitution or suspension of a sentence must be published in the Gazette.

|President
|Emmerson Mnangagwa
|ZANU-PF
|24 November 2017
|-
|Vice-President
|Constantino Chiwenga
|ZANU-PF
|28 December 2017
|}

Under Zimbabwe's Constitution, the president is the head of state, government and commander-in-chief of the defense forces, elected by popular majority vote. Prior to 2013, the president was elected for a 6-year term with no term limits. The new constitution approved in the 2013 constitutional referendum limits the president to two 5-year terms, but this does not take effect retrospectively (Robert Mugabe had held the office from 1987 to 2017).

The Cabinet is appointed by the president and responsible to the House of Assembly.

The Minister of State for Presidential Affairs is a non-cabinet ministerial position in the government of Zimbabwe. The incumbent is Didymus Mutasa. The duties of the position have yet to be publicly defined.

Legislature

Parliament consists of the House of Assembly and, since 2005, the Senate, which had previously been abolished in 1990. The House of Assembly has 210 members elected by universal suffrage, including the Speaker, and the Attorney General, and may serve for a maximum of five years. Under the 2013 constitution, the Senate consists of 80 members, of whom 60 are elected for five-year terms in 6-member constituencies representing one of the 10 provinces, elected based on the votes in the lower house election, using party-list proportional representation, distributed using the hare quota. Additionally the Senate consists of 2 seats for each non-metropolitan district of Zimbabwe elected by each provincial assembly of chiefs using SNTV, 1 seat each for the president and deputy president of the National Council of Chiefs and 1 male and 1 female seat for people with disabilities elected on separate ballots using FPTP by an electoral college designated by the National Disability Board.

Judiciary

The judiciary is headed by the Chief Justice of the Supreme Court of Zimbabwe who, like their contemporaries, is appointed by the President on the advice of the Judicial Service Commission. The Constitution has a Bill of Rights containing extensive protection of human rights. The Bill of Rights could not be amended for the first 10 years of independence except by unanimous vote of Parliament.

The Supreme Court is the highest court of order and the final court of appeal. The Chief Justice is the senior judge. Others who sit on the bench of the Supreme Court of Zimbabwe are Justice Paddington Garwe, former Judge-President of the High Court, Wilson Sandura and Vernanda Ziyambi. Luke Malaba, a former justice of the Supreme Court, was appointed acting chief justice on 1 March 2017 following the retirement of Chief Justice Godfrey Chidyausiku. Malaba was promoted to chief justice on 28 March.

The legal system is based on Roman-Dutch law with South African influences. A five-member Supreme Court, headed by the Chief-Justice has original jurisdiction over alleged violations of fundamental rights guaranteed in the constitution and appellate jurisdiction over other matters. There is a High Court consisting of general and appellate divisions. Below the High Court are regional magistrate's courts with civil jurisdiction and magistrate's courts with both civil and criminal jurisdiction over cases involving traditional law and custom. Beginning in 1981, these courts were integrated into the national system.

List of Chief Justices of Zimbabwe:

Provincial governance

Main articles: Provinces of Zimbabwe, Districts of Zimbabwe

Zimbabwe is divided into eight provinces, each administered by a provincial governor appointed by the President. The provincial governor is assisted by the provincial administrator and representatives of several service ministries. The provinces are further divided into 63 districts.Provinces are constituent political entities of Zimbabwe. Zimbabwe currently has ten provinces, two of which are cities with provincial status. Zimbabwe is a unitary state, and its provinces exercise only the powers that the central government chooses to delegate. Provinces are divided into districts, which are divided into wards.

The Constitution of Zimbabwe delineates provincial governance and powers. After constitutional amendments in 1988, provinces were administered by a governor directly appointed by the President of Zimbabwe.[1] Since the 2013 constitutional changes, there are technically no longer provincial governors, though in practice they remain in place as Ministers of State for Provincial Affairs. The 2013 Constitution also calls for the devolution of governmental powers and responsibilities where appropriate, though Zimbabwean opposition parties argue that the central government has yet to comply.[2]

With the establishment of Company rule in Rhodesia in the 1890s, the country was divided into two provinces: Matabeleland in the west and Mashonaland in the east. Under British colonial rule as Southern Rhodesia, the colony was divided into five provinces. Later, the Rhodesian government expanded the number of provinces to seven: Manicaland, Matabeleland North and South, Mashonaland North and South, Midlands, and Victoria (today Masvingo).[3] In the 1980s, Mashonaland North and South became three provincesThe youngest provinces, Bulawayo and Harare, were created in 1997.

Political parties and elections

Presidential elections

House of Assembly elections

Senate elections

International organization participation

Zimbabwe participates in the following Pan-African and international organisations:

| width="50%" align="left" valign="top" style="border:0"|
ACP
AfDB
Commonwealth of Nations (formerly from 1980 to 2003)
ECA
FAO
G-15
G-77
IAEA
IBRD
ICAO
ICCt (signatory)
ICFTU
ICRM
IDA
IFAD
IFC
IFRCS
ILO
IMF
Interpol
IOC
IOM
| width="50%" align="left" valign="top" style="border:0"|
ISO
ITU
NAM
OAU
OPCW
PCA
PMAESA
SADC
United Nations
UNCTAD
UNESCO
UNIDO
UNMIK
UPU
WCL
WCO
WFTU
WHO
WIPO
WMO
WToO
WTrO

See also

 Education in Zimbabwe
 Political history of Zimbabwe
 Politics of Rhodesia

References

External links